Senator Chang may refer to:

Ling Ling Chang (born 1976), California State Senate
Stanley Chang (fl. 2010s), Hawaii State Senate
Stephanie Chang (fl. 2000s–2010s), Michigan State Senate

See also
Sonia Chang-Díaz (born 1978), Massachusetts State Senate